Cardiff East was a parliamentary constituency in Cardiff which returned one Member of Parliament to the House of Commons of the Parliament of the United Kingdom from 1918 until it was abolished for the 1950 general election.

Boundaries 
The County Borough of Cardiff wards of Park, Roath, and Splott.

Members of Parliament

Election results

Elections in the 1910s 

Seager received Coalition Government endorsement letter which was later withdrawn

Elections in the 1920s

Elections in the 1930s

Elections in the 1940s
General Election 1939–40:

Another General Election was required to take place before the end of 1940. The political parties had been making preparations for an election to take place from 1939 and by the end of this year, the following candidates had been selected; 
Conservative: Owen Temple-Morris

References 
Craig, F. W. S. (1983). British parliamentary election results 1918–1949 (3 ed.). Chichester: Parliamentary Research Services. .
 

Politics of Cardiff
History of Glamorgan
Historic parliamentary constituencies in South Wales
Constituencies of the Parliament of the United Kingdom established in 1918
Constituencies of the Parliament of the United Kingdom disestablished in 1950